Notable Polish novelists, poets, playwrights, historians and philosophers, listed in chronological order by year of birth:

 (ca.1465–after 1529) Biernat of Lublin
 (1482–1537) Andrzej Krzycki
 (1503–1572) Andrzej Frycz Modrzewski
 (1505–1569) Mikołaj Rej
 (ca. 1525–1573) Piotr z Goniądza
 (1530–1584) Jan Kochanowski
 (1566–1636) Fabian Birkowski
 (1580–1653) Szymon Okolski
 (1651–1701) Anna Stanisławska
 (1694–1774) Przybysław Dyjamentowski
 (1720–1784) Franciszek Bohomolec
 (1733–1798) Adam Naruszewicz
 (1734–1823) Adam Kazimierz Czartoryski
 (1735–1801) Ignacy Krasicki
 (1746–1835) Izabela Fleming Czartoryska
 (1750–1812) Hugo Kołłątaj 
 (1755–1826) Stanisław Staszic
 (1757–1829) Wojciech Bogusławski
 (1757–1841) Julian Ursyn Niemcewicz
 (1761–1815) Jan Potocki
 (1762–1808) Franciszek Ksawery Dmochowski
 (1765–1809) Cyprian Godebski
 (1768–1854) Maria Wirtemberska
 (1770–1861) Adam Jerzy Czartoryski
 (1771–1820) Alojzy Feliński
 (1786–1861) Joachim Lelewel
 (1787–1861) Antoni Gorecki
 (1791–1835) Kazimierz Brodziński
 (1793–1876) Aleksander Fredro
 (1798–1855) Adam Mickiewicz
 (1798–1845) Klementyna Hoffmanowa
 (1801–1869) Franciszek Ksawery Godebski
 (1801–1876) Seweryn Goszczyński
 (1804–1886) Michał Czajkowski
 (1807–1875) Karol Libelt
 (1809–1849) Juliusz Słowacki
 (1812–1859) Zygmunt Krasiński
 (1812–1887) Józef Ignacy Kraszewski
 (1814–1894) August Cieszkowski
 (1817–1879) Ryszard Wincenty Berwiński
 (1818–1876) Narcyza Żmichowska
 (1819–1890) Agnieszka Baranowska
 (1821–1883) Cyprian Kamil Norwid
 (1822–1899) Edmund Chojecki
 (1829–1901) Lucyna Ćwierczakiewiczowa
 (1838–1897) Adam Asnyk
 (1839–1902) Adolf Dygasiński
 (1841–1910) Eliza Orzeszkowa
 (1846–1916) Henryk Sienkiewicz
 (1847–1912) Bolesław Prus
 (1849–1935) Michał Bobrzyński
 (1852–1930) Kazimierz Bartoszewicz
 (1858–1924) Ludwik Stasiak
 (1860–1921) Gabriela Zapolska
 (1860–1926) Jan Kasprowicz
 (1862–1949) Feliks Koneczny
 (1864–1925) Stefan Żeromski
 (1864–1935) Franciszek Nowicki
 (1865–1940) Kazimierz Przerwa-Tetmajer
 (1867–1925) Władysław Reymont
 (1868–1927) Stanisław Przybyszewski
 (1869–1907) Stanisław Wyspiański
 (1870-1932) Malwina Garfeinowa-Garska
 (1873–1940) Wacław Berent
 (1874–1915) Jerzy Żuławski
 (1874–1941) Tadeusz Boy-Żeleński
 (1876–1945) Ferdynand Antoni Ossendowski
 (1877/79–1937) Bolesław Leśmian
 (1878–1911) Stanisław Brzozowski
 (1878/79–1942) Janusz Korczak
 (1881–1946) Paweł Hulka-Laskowski
 (1884–1944) Leon Chwistek
 (1885–1939) Stanisław Ignacy Witkiewicz (Witkacy)
 (1885–1954) Zofia Nałkowska
 (1886–1980) Władysław Tatarkiewicz
 (1886–1981) Tadeusz Kotarbiński
 (1887–1936) Stefan Grabiński
 (1889–1968) Zofia Kossak-Szczucka
 (1889–1931) Tadeusz Hołówko
 (1889–1965) Maria Dąbrowska
 (1890–1963) Kazimierz Ajdukiewicz
 (1891–1963) Gustaw Morcinek
 (1891–1945) Maria Pawlikowska-Jasnorzewska
 (1892–1942) Bruno Schulz
 (1893–1970) Roman Ingarden
 (1894–1942) Józef Stefan Godlewski
 (1894–1969) Kazimierz Wierzyński
 (1894–1980) Jarosław Iwaszkiewicz
 (1894–1985) Arkady Fiedler
 (1895–1959) Stanislaw Mlodozeniec
 (1896–1945) Ferdynand Ossendowski
 (1897–1962) Władysław Broniewski
 (1898–1939) Tadeusz Dołęga-Mostowicz
 (1899–1956) Jan Lechoń
 (1900–1966) Jan Brzechwa
 (1901–1938) Bruno Jasieński 
 (1901–1964) Sergiusz Piasecki
 (1902–1970) Tadeusz Manteuffel
 (1902–1985) Józef Mackiewicz
 (1902–1995) Józef Maria Bocheński
 (1903–1978) Aleksander Kamiński
 (1904–1969) Witold Gombrowicz
 (1905–1953) Konstanty Ildefons Gałczyński
 (1905–1982) Adam Ważyk
 (1906–1965) Stanisław Jaśkowski
 (1907–1991) Stanislaw Wygodzki
 (1908–1979) Sydor Rey
 (1908–1988) Teodor Parnicki
 (1908–1980) Aleksander Baumgardten
 (1909–1942) Henryka Łazowertówna
 (1909–1966) Stanisław Jerzy Lec
 (1909–1970) Paweł Jasienica
 (1909–1983) Jerzy Andrzejewski
 (1909–1988) Józef Łobodowski
 (1910–1978) Maria Boniecka
 (1910–2007) Stanisław Dobosiewicz
 (1911–1975) Eugeniusz Żytomirski
 (1911–2004) Czesław Miłosz
 (1912–1990) Adolf Rudnicki
 (1913–1979) Zygmunt Witymir Bieńkowski
 (1913–2005) Józef Garliński
 (1914–1973) Bohdan Arct
 (1915–2006) Jan Twardowski
 (1916–1991) Wilhelm Szewczyk
 (1917–1944) Zuzanna Ginczanka
 (1918–1963) Stanisław Grzesiuk
 (1919–2000) Gustaw Herling-Grudziński
 (1919–2011) Marian Pankowski
 (1920–2006) Leslaw Bartelski
 (1920–1985) Leopold Tyrmand
 (1920–2005) Karol Wojtyła (Pope John Paul II)
 (1920–2006) Lucjan Wolanowski
 (1921–1944) Krzysztof Kamil Baczyński
 (1921–2006) Stanisław Lem
 (1922–1951) Tadeusz Borowski
 (1923–2001) Maksymilian Berezowski
 (1923–2003) Władysław Kozaczuk
 (1923–2012) Wisława Szymborska
 (1924–1998) Zbigniew Herbert
 (born 1925) Bat-Sheva Dagan
 (1926–2015) Tadeusz Konwicki
 (1927–2009) Leszek Kołakowski
 (1928–2015) Roman Frister
 (1929–1994) Zbigniew Nienacki
 (1929–2004) Zygmunt Kubiak
 (1930–2013) Sławomir Mrożek
 (1930-1994) Bogdan-Dawid Wojdowski
 (born 1932) Wiesław Myśliwski
 (1932–1957) Andrzej Bursa
 (1932–2013) Joanna Chmielewska
 (1932–2007) Ryszard Kapuściński
 (1933–1991) Jerzy Kosiński
 (born 1933) Joanna Olczak-Ronikier
 (1934–1969) Marek Hłasko
 (1934–1976) Stanisław Grochowiak
 (1935–1984) Janusz Gaudyn
 (born 1936) Henryk Grynberg
 (1936–1997) Agnieszka Osiecka
 (born 1937) Hanna Krall
 (1938–1985) Janusz A. Zajdel
 (1938–2017) Janusz Głowacki
 (1941–1989) Mirosław Dzielski
 (born 1941) Leszek Długosz
 (1943–2020) Wojciech Karpiński
 (born 1944) Michał Heller
 (born 1945) Małgorzata Musierowicz
 (1946–2015) Piotr Domaradzki
 (born 1946) Ewa Kuryluk
 (born 1948) Andrzej Sapkowski
 (born 1949) Stefan Chwin
 (born 1949) Aleksandra Ziolkowska-Boehm
 (born 1950) Stanisław Bereś
 (born 1952) Eva Stachniak
 (born 1952) Jerzy Pilch
 (born 1954) Marek Huberath
 (born 1955) Leszek Engelking
 (born 1955) Magdalena Tulli
 (born 1957) Grazyna Miller
 (born 1957) Paweł Huelle
 (born 1957) Agata Tuszynska
 (born 1957) Grażyna Wojcieszko
 (1958–2005) Tomasz Pacyński
 (born 1960) Andrzej Stasiuk
 (born 1960) Andrzej Ziemiański
 (born 1961) Agnieszka Taborska
 (born 1962) Olga Tokarczuk
 (born 1964) Rafal A. Ziemkiewicz
 (born 1965) Jarosław Grzędowicz
 (born 1966) Andrzej Majewski
 (born 1966) Marek Krajewski
 (born 1966) Mariusz Szczygieł
 (born 1967) Ewa Białołęcka
 (born 1968) Joanna Bator
 (born 1971) Anna Brzezińska
 (born 1972) Wojciech Kuczok
 (born 1974) Jacek Dukaj
 (born 1974) Andrzej Pilipiuk
 (born 1975) Michał Witkowski
 (born 1976) Zygmunt Miłoszewski
 (born 1976) Anna Kańtoch
 (born 1977) Łukasz Orbitowski
 (born 1978) Żanna Słoniowska
 (born 1979) Sylwia Chutnik
 (born 1980) Jacek Dehnel
 (born 1982) Jakub Ćwiek
 (born 1983) Dorota Masłowska
 (born 1984) Joanna Lech
 (born 1985) Xawery Stańczyk
 (born 1989) Weronika Murek

See also
 List of Polish women writers
 Polish literature
 List of authors
 Polish language
 List of Poles
 History of philosophy in Poland

References

Polish
Authors